Route 440 is a  long mostly North–South secondary highway in the northwest portion of New Brunswick, Canada.

The route's Northern terminus starts at the intersection of Route 134 and Route 11 in the community of St. Margarets. The Road begins traveling south-west through a mostly treed area passing through the community of Wine River, Rosaireville and finally Shediac Ridge before entering the community of Rogersville as the road Rue des Erables ending at Route 126.

History

Intersecting routes
None

See also

References

440
440